Fossalta may refer to:

 Fossalta di Piave, town in the Metropolitan City of Venice, Veneto, Italy
 Fossalta di Portogruaro, town in the Metropolitan City of Venice, Veneto, Italy